Stefan Roehnert (born 19 October 1977 in Koblenz) is a German rower. Together with Sebastian Mayer he finished 4th in the men's double sculls at the 2000 Summer Olympics.

References
 
 

1977 births
Living people
German male rowers
Sportspeople from Koblenz
Rowers at the 2000 Summer Olympics
Olympic rowers of Germany
Sportspeople from Rhineland-Palatinate
World Rowing Championships medalists for Germany